Here is a partial list of Taiwanese television shows:

News

 CTS News (華視新聞) - CTS
 CTV News (中視新聞) - CTV
 FTV News (民視新聞) - FTV
 PTS News (公視新聞) - PTS
 TTV News (台視新聞) - TTV

Studio shows

Comedy shows

 Chung T'ien Television (CTi) - CTi Entertainment
 Celebrity Imitated Shows (全民最大黨) (2011-2013) - formerly Everybody Speaks Nonsenses II – Hot Pot (全民大悶鍋) (2004–2007)

Talk shows

 Chung T'ien Television (CTi) - CTi Variety
 Mr Con. and Mrs. Csi (康熙來了) (2004–2016)
 SS Xiaoyan Night (SS小燕之夜)

Entertainment/variety shows

 Taiwan Television (TTV) - TTV Main Channel
 All Pass (百萬小學堂) (2008-present)
 Diamond Club (鑽石夜總會) (2008-present)
 Million Singer (百萬大歌星) (2008-present)

 China Television (CTV) - CTV Main Channel
 (綜藝大本營) (2011–present)
 Guess (你猜你猜你猜猜猜) (2011–2012) - formerly 我猜我猜我猜猜猜 (1996–2010)

 Chung T'ien Television (CTi) - CTi Variety
 Did you go to University yet? (大學生了沒) (2007–present)

 Gala Television (GTV) - GTV Variety Show
 100% Entertainment (娛樂百分百) (1997–present)

 Sanlih E-Television (SETTV) - SET Metro/SET Variety
 Showbiz (完全娛樂)

 Channel V Taiwan
 Wo Ai Hei Se Hui (我愛黑澀會) (2005-2009)
 Mo Fan Bang Bang Tang (模范棒棒堂) (2006-2009)

Competition shows

 Taiwan Television (TTV) - TTV Main Channel
 Super Idol (Taiwanese TV series) (超級偶像) (2007–2014)

 China Television (CTV) - CTV Main Channel
 One Million Star (超級星光大道) (2007–????) 
 One Million Star (season 1) (超級星光大道 (第一屆)) (2007)
 One Million Star (season 2) (超級星光大道 (第二屆)) (2007)
 One Million Star (season 3) (超級星光大道 (第三屆)) (2008)
 One Million Star (season 4) (超級星光大道 (第四屆)) (2008)
 One Million Star (season 5) (超級星光大道 (第五屆)) (2009)
 One Million Star (season 6) (超級星光大道 (第六屆)) (2009)
 One Million Star Star Legend Contest (超級星光大道：星光傳奇賽) (2010)
 One Million Star (season 7) (超級星光大道 (第七屆)) (2010)
 Chinese Million Star (華人星光大道) (2011–????)

Dramas

Historical dramas
 1984 - Book and Sword Chronicles (書劍江山) - Taiwan Television (TTV) (台視)
 1985 - Chor Lau-heung (1985 TV series) (楚留香新傳) - China Television (CTV) (中視)
 1992 - The Book and the Sword (1992 TV series) (書劍恩仇錄) - Chinese Television System (CTS)
 1993 - New Legend of Madame White Snake (新白娘子傳奇)
 1995 - Chor Lau-heung (1995 TV series) (香帥傳奇) - Taiwan Television (TTV)
 2002 - Book and Sword, Gratitude and Revenge (書劍恩仇錄) - China Television (CTV)

Reality dramas
 1983 - Star Knows My Heart (星星知我心)
 1984 - Last Night Stars (昨夜星辰)
 1998 - Old House Has Joy (老房有喜)
 1999 - April Rhapsody (人間四月天)
 1999 - Once Upon a Time (曾經) - 2000 Best Miniseries or Television Film for 25th Golden Bell Awards
 2001 - The Pawnshop No. 8 (第8號當舖)
 2004 to 2006 - The Unforgettable Memory (意難忘) - Formosa Television (FTV)
 2007 - New Last Night Stars (新昨夜星辰)

Reality shows
 Circus Action

See also
 Taiwanese drama
 List of Taiwanese dramas
 Taiwan Public Television Service Foundation (PTS)
 Television in Taiwan
 List of Chinese-language television channels
 List of television programs
 Censorship in Taiwan
 Press Freedom Index
 Media of Taiwan

References

 
Taiwan
Television series, List of